is an operetta by Leo Fall. The German libretto was by Alfred Maria Willner and Fritz Grünbaum.

Performance history

It was first performed at the Theater an der Wien in Vienna on 2 November 1907, conducted by the composer and starring Mizzi Günther as Alice. An English adaptation, called The Dollar Princess opened in London at Daly's Theatre on 25 September 1909 and ran for 428 performances.

Extant score

A piano score with German lyrics (but no vocal parts) is kept in Special Collections at the University of Leeds. It was digitised as part of a research project in 2018. A complete vocal score may be downloaded from IMSLP, here.

Roles

References

Sources
"Fall, Leo(pold)" by Andrew Lamb, in The New Grove Dictionary of Opera, ed. Stanley Sadie (London, 1992) 

Operas by Leo Fall
German-language operettas
1907 operas
Operas